Rouen Castle (Château Bouvreuil) was a fortified ducal and royal residence in the city of Rouen, capital of the duchy of Normandy, now in France.  With the exception of the tower wrongly associated with Joan of Arc, which was restored by Viollet-le-Duc, the castle was destroyed at the end of the 16th century, its stones quarried for other construction.

History 
The castle was built by Philip II of France from 1204 to 1210 following his capture of the duchy from John, Duke of Normandy and King of England. Located outside the medieval town to its north, in a dominant position, it played a military role in the Hundred Years' War and the Wars of Religion. It was the main seat of power, administration and politics in the duchy of Normandy for nearly 400 years, symbolically replacing the ducal palace of Rouen in these roles – of the bailliage and vicomté of the king of France, of the English government of the area (1418–1449), of the échiquier de Normandie (which became the Parlement de Normandie). It was here that Joan of Arc was imprisoned in December 1430 and tried from 21 February to 23 May 1431. The castle was probably the site of the birth of Edward IV of England who was born at Rouen in 1442.

Vulnerable to artillery like other medieval fortresses, all but the keep (now known as the Tour Jeanne d'Arc) was dismantled in 1591.

Tour Jeanne d'Arc
Formerly known as the castle's donjon or "Grosse Tour", this tower is part of Philip's 1204 phase. It housed one of the sessions of Joan of Arc's trial on 9 May 1431, one in which she was shown the instruments of torture, to which she replied "Truly, if you have to pull my members and my soul from my body, I shall say nothing else; and if I say something to you, I would always say to you afterwards that you made me say it by force.". She was not imprisoned here but in the now-lost Tour de la Pucelle, whose foundations may be seen at 102 rue Jeanne d'Arc. The pointed roof was added in restoration works beginning in the 1870s. During the Second World War the tower was camouflaged and turned into a bunker by the occupying German forces. It is now open to the public.

References

Further reading
Dominique Léost, Geoff Simkins (translator), The castle of Rouen and its keep known as the "Joan of Arc Tower", musées départementaux de Seine-Maritime, 2004, 47p

External links
 Tour Jeanne d'Arc - Visiting information

Castles in Seine-Maritime
Castle
Duchy of Normandy
Tourist attractions in Seine-Maritime